Koonce is a surname. Notable people with the surname include:

Cal Koonce (1940–1993), American baseball player
Donnie Ray Koonce (born 1959), American basketball player
George Koonce (born 1968), American football player
Graham Koonce (born 1975), American baseball player
Lisa Koonce, American academic
Malcolm Koonce (born 1998), American football player